The smallskin tree frog (Boana microderma) is a species of frog in the family Hylidae found in Brazil, Colombia, and Peru. Its natural habitats are subtropical or tropical moist lowland forests and rivers.

References

Boana
Amphibians of Brazil
Amphibians of Colombia
Amphibians of Peru
Amphibians described in 1977
Taxonomy articles created by Polbot